Joseph Keith Hardy (born 26 September 1998) is an English professional footballer who plays for  club Marine as a forward, on loan from  club Accrington Stanley. He is a graduate of the Manchester City academy and began his professional career with Brentford and Liverpool.

Career

Manchester City 
A forward or right winger, Hardy began his career with Tranmere Rovers at age eight and moved to the academy at Premier League club Manchester City at the age of 13. He progressed through the ranks and made his U18 team debut while still an U16 and signed a two-year scholarship deal at the end of the 2014–15 season. Hardy scored 11 goals in 20 U18 appearances during the 2015–16 season and had a spell on loan at the Stoke City academy. He showed prolific form during the 2016–17 season, scoring 12 goals in 11 starts, before departing the Etihad Campus in March 2017.

Brentford 
On 14 March 2017, Hardy joined the B team at Championship club Brentford on a three-year contract. Over the course of the following  years, he scored 40 goals in 80 appearances and was voted the 2018–19 Brentford B Players' Player of the Year. Hardy gave a man of the match performance and scored two goals in Brentford B's 4–0 2019 Middlesex Senior Cup Final victory over Harrow Borough on 16 April 2019. He was frozen out of the B team during the first half of the 2019–20 season and departed the club in January 2020.

Liverpool 
After an attempt to sign him during the 2019 summer transfer window had failed, Hardy transferred to the U23 team at Premier League club Liverpool in January 2020. He signed a contract running until the end of the 2019–20 season for an undisclosed fee. On 4 February, Hardy made his professional debut as a substitute for Liam Millar after 82 minutes of a 1–0 FA Cup fourth round replay win over Shrewsbury Town. He signed a one-year contract extension in June 2020, but missed the 2020–21 pre-season through injury. After returning to fitness, Hardy was included in Liverpool's 25-man 2020–21 Premier League squad as a home grown player, though he did not win a call into a matchday squad during the season. After making five appearances and scoring one goal for the U23 and EFL Trophy squads, he was sidelined for  months with an ankle ligament injury sustained during a Premier League 2 match versus Southampton U23 on 21 November 2020. Hardy finished the 2020–21 U23 season with 6 goals in 12 appearances and was released when his contract expired.

Accrington Stanley 
On 8 July 2021, Hardy signed a two-year contract with League One club Accrington Stanley on a free transfer. He suffered a calf injury in pre-season, which required surgery and he returned to full training in late November. On 27 January 2022, Hardy joined Scottish Championship club Inverness Caledonian Thistle on loan until the end of the 2021–22 season. In a season which concluded with defeat in the Scottish Premiership playoff Final, Hardy made 18 appearances and scored his first senior goal, in a 4–0 win over Hamilton Academical on 29 April 2022.

Hardy was again absent from the matchday squad throughout the 2022–23 season and on 17 March 2023, he joined Northern Premier League Premier Division club Marine on loan until the end of the campaign.

Personal life 
Hardy attended St Winefride's Catholic Primary School in Neston and St. Anselm's College in Birkenhead.

Career statistics

Honours 
Brentford B

 Middlesex Senior Cup: 2018–19

Individual

 Brentford B Players' Player of the Year: 2018–19

References

External links 
 

Joe Hardy at accringtonstanley.co.uk

Living people
English footballers
Brentford F.C. players
Association football forwards
1998 births
Sportspeople from Wirral
Association football wingers
Liverpool F.C. players
Manchester City F.C. players
People educated at St. Anselm's College
Accrington Stanley F.C. players
Inverness Caledonian Thistle F.C. players
Scottish Professional Football League players
Footballers from Merseyside
Marine F.C. players
Northern Premier League players